The FM H-12-44 was a yard switcher produced by Fairbanks-Morse from May 1950 until March 1961.

Of the 336 H-12-44 locomotives produced, 303 were for American railroads, 30 were made between August 1951 to June 1956 by the Canadian Locomotive Company for use in Canada, and one was exported to Mexico. 

H-12-44s were visually indistinguishable from the predecessor FM H-10-44 until September 1952, when the Raymond Loewy design elements were removed to reduce production costs. Cab lines were squared-off, the slanted-nose styling was discontinued, and the roof visor was eliminated. The following year, the fairing over the battery box was removed and louvers added to reduce the chance of battery explosions. Production paused from May to October 1956, after which the carbodies were shortened by some three feet and outfitted with a deeper side skirt.

Sixteen intact examples of the H-12-44 are known to survive, all of which are owned by railroad museums or historical societies.

One FM H-12-44TS, Santa Fe 543, now resides at the Illinois Railway Museum.

Units produced by Fairbanks-Morse (1950–1961)

Preservation

Several examples of the H-12-44 model have been preserved around the U.S. and Canada.

Weyerhaeuser Timber Company #1 is preserved at the Northwest Railway Museum in Snoqualmie, Washington. After undergoing a full rebuild and engine overhaul, the locomotive is now run only for special events with its partner caboose, White River Logging Company number 001.
Former US Army #1843 is a part of the collection at the Rochester & Genesee Valley Railroad Museum in Rush, New York (south of Rochester). It is in operable condition and is a key locomotive at the RGVRRM.
Former US Army later US Steel #1845 is currently stored at Fairless Hills, Pennsylvania, undergoing restoration. It is privately owned.
Former US Army #1847 is preserved at the Golden Gate Railroad Museum in Sunol, California. It is currently operational and has been painted in "Tiger Stripe" scheme to represent Southern Pacific #1487.
Former US Army #1849 is preserved for static display at the Bluegrass Railroad Museum in Versailles, Kentucky.
Former US Army #1850, #1853 and #1861 are stored out of service at the Heart of Dixie Railroad Museum in Calera, Alabama.
Former US Army #1855 owned and operated (on excursion train) by Nevada State RR Museum, Boulder City, Nevada. 
Former US Army #1854 switches Business Depot Ogden in Utah as of 2019. It wears Utah Central 1854 and Defense Logistics Agency 53205.
Former US Army #1857 is preserved at the Western Pacific Railroad Museum at Portola, California.  It was used at the Sierra Army Depot at Herlong, California, located along the former Western Pacific Railroad. It is used in the museum's famous "Rent-A-Locomotive" program.
Former US Army unit #1860, worked at Sunny Point Military Ocean Terminal.  It later went to Beaufort & Morehead Railroad in North Carolina as #1860, based at the Morehead City State Ports. The North Carolina Transportation Museum acquired the locomotive in 2004 after disposition from the State Ports.
Former US Steel #9121 is preserved by the United Railroad Historical Society of New Jersey. Restoration is underway at SMS Railroad in Bridgeport, New Jersey.
Atchison, Topeka and Santa Fe #608 (formerly #508) is at the Museum of the American Railroad in Frisco, TX, following a 2017 transfer from the California State Railroad Museum in Sacramento, California. 
Atchison, Topeka and Santa Fe #560 is preserved at the Southern California Railway Museum in Perris, California
Milwaukee Road 740 is preserved at the Mad River and NKP Railroad Museum in Bellevue, Ohio. It was originally numbered 2310.

References
 
 
 
 
 

Specific

External links

 Fairbanks-Morse H12-44, H12-44TS & H12-46 Roster
 Preserved Fairbanks Morse Yard Power
 Southern Pacific Fairbanks-Morse H12-44 Roster
 Weyerhaeuser Timber Co. Fairbanks Morse H-12-44 Diesel Electric Locomotive WTC 1

B-B locomotives
H-12-44
CLC locomotives
Railway locomotives introduced in 1950
Diesel-electric locomotives of the United States
Standard gauge locomotives of the United States
Standard gauge locomotives of Canada
Standard gauge locomotives of Mexico
Diesel-electric locomotives of Canada
Diesel-electric locomotives of Mexico